The Sutjeska class was a class of two diesel-electric submarines built for the Yugoslav Navy during the late 1950s and early 1960s. Built by the Uljanik Shipyard in Pula, the two boats were the first class of submarines to be built in Yugoslavia.

Design

The design was done in Yugoslavia and Soviet sensors (radar and sonar) were used. The ships had a refit in the 1970s with modernised sonar.

Boats

References
 Conway's All the World's Fighting Ships 1947–1995

Ships of the Yugoslav Navy
Submarine classes